Pilophyllum is a monotypic genus of flowering plants from the orchid family, Orchidaceae. The sole species is Pilophyllum villosum, native to Malaysia, Indonesia, Thailand, the Philippines, New Guinea and the Solomon Islands.

See also 
 List of Orchidaceae genera

References 

 Berg Pana, H. 2005. Handbuch der Orchideen-Namen. Dictionary of Orchid Names. Dizionario dei nomi delle orchidee. Ulmer, Stuttgart

External links 

Collabieae
Monotypic Epidendroideae genera
Collabieae genera
Orchids of the Philippines
Orchids of Indonesia
Orchids of Thailand
Orchids of Malaysia
Orchids of New Guinea
Flora of the Solomon Islands (archipelago)